Ruby Kless Sondock (born April 26, 1926) is a former Associate Justice of the Texas Supreme Court. She was the first woman to serve on the Texas Supreme Court.

Sondock initially attended the University of Houston Law Center in order to become a legal secretary, but she was admitted to the state bar a year before her graduation as valedictorian of her class (1962). Sondock was appointed to the Harris County Domestic Relations Court No. 5 in 1973 and to the 234th District Court in 1977. Sondock was the first woman to be appointed as a State District Judge in Harris County, Texas.

Sondock was appointed to the Texas Supreme Court following the death of Associate Justice James G. Denton on June 10, 1982. Sondock served from June 25 to December 31 of that year, completing Denton's term. Sondock declined to seek election to the Supreme Court and instead ran successfully for reelection to her District Court seat the following year. Sondock was the court's first female justice, with the exception of a special all-woman court convened in 1925 to hear a single case.  Sondock formed part of the majority of the Texas Supreme Court in the landmark case of Helicopteros Nacionales de Colombia, S. A. v. Hall.

A distinguished legal mind, Sondock has received a number of accolades, including an annual lecture series on legal ethics.  Former speakers at the Sondock Lecture on Legal Ethics at the University of Houston Law Center include U.S. Senator Orrin Hatch and Helen Thomas. On November 11, 2015, the Litigation Section of the State Bar of Texas inducted Sondock as a "Texas Legal Legend."

See also 
 List of female state supreme court justices

References

External links
Interview (video)

1926 births
Living people
Justices of the Texas Supreme Court
Texas Democrats
20th-century American women judges
20th-century American judges
University of Houston Law Center alumni
20th-century American women lawyers
20th-century American lawyers
Texas lawyers
Texas state court judges